Mohamed Ibrahim (born 1 March 1992) is an Egyptian footballer who plays as an attacking midfielder for Ceramica Cleopatra.

Career

Zamalek
Ibrahim is a product of Zamalek's youth academy. He made his debut with the club's first team in a league game with the coach Hossam Hassan. Despite playing only 4 games in his debut season, Ibrahim was considered as one of the key player at the start of 2011.
He scored his first goal against Al-Masry, which was chosen as one of the most beautiful goal of the whole season, not only because of its beauty, but also because of the circumstances - it was a last minute goal-winner.
He finished an outstanding first season with Zamalek with 15 appearances, scoring 2 goals in the process. He showed good speed, wonderful dribbling ability, great vision, and amazing play-making ability. European clubs had started to gain an interest in the player including French giants Lyon and Paris Saint-Germain.

The young Ibrahim started developing an attitude in the 2011–12 season under new coach Hassan Shehata. He stated more than once that he had no problem with Shehata, yet he still got himself into many controversies. Then he started to bash the Zamalek management publicly about his lack of playing time in the season. The Zamalek management later suspended him from playing for the team for a few months. This saw him see no action on the pitch for the end of the uncompleted 2011–12 Egyptian Premier League and the preliminary rounds of the 2012 CAF Champions League. After putting strong performances with the Egypt U-23 team in the 2012 Toulon Tournament and the 2012 Arab Nations Cup, he regained his place on the squad. Ibrahim later stated that he had an offer from a French club and he intended to go join the squad after the 2012 Summer Olympics. After the departure of Shehata and the arrival of Brazilian coach Jorvan Veira, Ibrahim was immediately used as a starting 11 player. He played full matches against Berekum Chelsea and TP Mazembe in the 2012 CAF Champions League, scoring against Chelsea in the process. In the final group stage game of the Champions League, Ibrahim scored Zamalek's only goal in a 1–1 draw with bitter rivals Al Ahly S.C. in the Cairo derby. After the 2012-13 Egyptian Premier League was postponed for the second time mid-October when it was supposed to begin on 17 October, Ibrahim stated that he was on his way out of Zamalek if the league is postponed for more time.

C.S. Marítimo
On 1 September 2014, Mohamed signed a five-year contract for the Portuguese side for reportedly worth €400,000, being the second Egyptian player to ever play for the club after the former Egyptian international Abdel Sattar Sabry.

Return to Egypt
In 2015, Ibrahim returned for Zamalek again. He stated that he returned to play in Egypt because of "Personal reasons".

In 2019, Ibrahim joined Misr Lel-Makkasa. In November 2020, he joined Ceramica Cleopatra.

International career
Mohamed was also member of Egypt U-20 team participating at 2011 FIFA U-20 World Cup. After an opening game against Brazil, the opponents coach - Ney Franco - told to the press: "The Egyptians performance was outstanding. They were very organised and some players, like Mohamed Ibrahim and Mohamed Salah, are awaiting a bright future".

Mohamed Ibrahim was also touted as a "future star" by Polish media,
described as "pearl". He scored 3 goals in the group match against Austria.
That was a first hat-trick scored by an African player in the history of this tournament.
Ibrahim had also put superb performances with the Egypt U-23 team in the 2012 Toulon Tournament and the 2012 Arab Nations Cup under coach Hany Ramzy.

Honours
Zamalek
 Egypt Cup: 2013, 2014, 2015, 2016, 2018
 Egyptian Super Cup: 2016
 CAF Confederation Cup: 2018–19
 Saudi-Egyptian Super Cup: 2018

References

1992 births
C.S. Marítimo players
Egypt international footballers
Egyptian expatriate footballers
Egyptian footballers
Expatriate footballers in Portugal
Living people
People from Beheira Governorate
Primeira Liga players
Zamalek SC players
Misr Lel Makkasa SC players
Egyptian Premier League players
Association football midfielders